D'Abadie/O'Meara is a parliamentary electoral district in Trinidad and Tobago in the center of Trinidad. It has been represented since the 2020 general election by Lisa Morris-Julian of the People's National Movement (PNM).

Constituency profile 
The constituency was created prior to the 2010 general election. It borders the constituencies of St. Augustine, Arima, Lopinot/Bon Air West, La Horquetta/Talparo and Arouca/Maloney. The main towns are D'Abadie, O'Meara, and Malabar. It had an electorate of 19,535 as of 2015.

Members of Parliament 
This constituency has elected the following members of the House of Representatives of Trinidad and Tobago:

Election results

Elections in the 2020s

Elections in the 2010s

References 

Constituencies of the Parliament of Trinidad and Tobago